The 2020–21 Lechia Gdańsk season was the club's 77th season of existence, and their 13th continuous in the top flight of Polish football. The season covered the period from 1 August 2020 to 30 June 2021. On 7 August 2020 the club celebrated its 75th anniversary.

Season information

The 2020–21 season saw Lechia's 75th anniversary as a club. To commemorate the occasion an anniversary home and away kit were released, with each kit being used in one game during the season. The home anniversary kit was worn in the home match against Podbeskidzie Bielsko-Biała, with the away anniversary kit being worn in the away match against Zagłębie Lubin.

Players

First team squad

 
 (on loan from Cracovia) 

 

 

 

 

 
 

Key

Out on loan

Promoted from academy

Transfers

In

Out

Competitions

Friendlies

Summer

Winter

Ekstraklasa

Regular season

League table

Polish Cup

Statistics

Goalscorers

References

Lechia Gdańsk seasons
Lechia Gdańsk